Tafsir Hedayat is an exegesis on the Quran written by Grand Ayatollah Mohammad Taqi al-Modarresi in eighteen volumes in Arabic. The author started the series in 1978 and finished it in six years. A translation of the series was published in Persian.

Methodology
In writing the exegesis, Al-Modarresi seeks to rely on the purpose of each verse in its contemporary use in the society. Al-Modarresi tries not to engage in technical discussion and rather emphasize on the educational aspects of each verse. Exegesis of each verse ends with a survey of narrations (hadiths) on that verse.

Al-Modarresi presents his comments by first mentioning a group of verses. He then describes the meanings of words that were borrowed from Majma' al-Bayan. He will then go over the morals of the verse and concludes it with new social issues that might relate to the verse.

References
 Mohammad Taqi al-Modarresi's English biography
 Ghadeer website, "Introducing Tafsir Hedayat and its translation"

Shia tafsir